Buffalo Airport  is a privately owned, public use airport in Randall County, Texas, United States. It is located nine nautical miles (10.4 mi, 16.7 km) south of the central business district of Amarillo.

Facilities and aircraft 
It has two runways with turf surfaces: 2/20 is 6,200 by 150 feet (1,890 x 46 m) and 8/26 is 1,600 by 102 feet (488 x 31 m).

For the 12-month period ending June 22, 2009, the airport had 7,800 general aviation aircraft operations, an average of 21 per day. At that time there were 57 aircraft based at this airport: 86% single-engine, 3.5% multi-engine and 10.5% ultralight.

References

External links 
  from TxDOT Airport Directory
 Aerial image as of April 2002 from USGS The National Map
 

Airports in Texas
Buildings and structures in Randall County, Texas
Transportation in Randall County, Texas